is a retired Japanese football player.

Youth
Nakamura played for his high school and university teams for Urayasu Tokai High School and Tokai University respectively.

Career
Nakamura have spent his entire professional football career in Singapore's S.League since he entered professional football with Sembawang Rangers FC in 2001 after passing a trial conducted by the team. He was a salaryman back in his native Japan prior to becoming a professional footballer. He has also played for Singapore Armed Forces FC, Albirex Niigata FC (Singapore), Balestier Khalsa FC, Woodlands Wellington FC and Tampines Rovers FC. He is currently one of the coaching staffs at Home United FC.

Personal life
Nakamura is married with a son and a daughter.

External links

References

http://kingaki.exblog.jp (blog) – In Japanese only.

He is currently also the general director for football academy called Global Football Academy (in Singapore) with an AFC B License.

1977 births
Living people
Tokai University alumni
Albirex Niigata Singapore FC players
Expatriate footballers in Singapore
Association football midfielders
Japanese expatriate footballers
Japanese expatriate sportspeople in Singapore
Japanese footballers
Sportspeople from Saitama (city)
Warriors FC players
Singapore Premier League players
Tampines Rovers FC players
Woodlands Wellington FC players
Balestier Khalsa FC players
Japanese expatriate sportspeople in Cambodia